Alexander Bernstein, Baron Bernstein of Craigweil (15 March 1936 – 13 April 2010) was a British television executive and a Labour member of the House of Lords.

Descending from Latvian Jewish immigrants and educated at Stowe School and St John's College, Cambridge, Bernstein joined the Granada Group, the leisure and television company founded by his uncle, Sidney, and his father, Cecil Bernstein. He was a director of the company, managing director of Granada Television in the 1970s, and Chairman of Granada Group 1979–96.

Bernstein was a major contributor to the Labour Leader's Office Fund run by Lord Levy to finance Tony Blair's private office. He was created a life peer as Baron Bernstein of Craigweil, of Craigweil in the County of West Sussex, on 15 May 2000. He was also active in the arts, serving on several governing bodies and trusts.

He married Vanessa Anne Mills in 1962; they had a son and a daughter, and divorced in 1993. In 1995, he married Angela Mary Serota, the former wife of Sir Nicholas Serota.

References

1939 births
2010 deaths
Alumni of St John's College, Cambridge
British Jews
British television executives
Bernstein of Craigweil, Alexander Bernstein, Baron
People educated at Stowe School
Jewish British politicians
20th-century British businesspeople
Life peers created by Elizabeth II